1979 is a 2001 novel by the Swiss writer Christian Kracht. It is set in 1979 and tells the story of a homosexual young man who travels to Tehran with his ex-boyfriend at the time of the Iranian Revolution, where his co-traveller dies during a drug binge. He is then convinced to travel to Tibet to climb the sacred Mount Kailash, only to be captured by the Chinese army. The man is largely unaffected by the political events around him and pays more attention to art, music, food and furnishings. The original book cover was designed by Peter Saville, known for his record sleeves for artists associated with Factory Records.

Reception
Elke Heidenreich of Der Spiegel wrote: "It is a laconic novel about the lack of sense, of global ideas, it is the likewise laconic statement that you can do anything to a man, even subdue him to inhuman totalitarianism, because he has no capability for resistance whatsoever." The critic continued: "1979 is a novel about decadence — the decadence of western consumption and eastern doctrines of salvation, the decadence of prison camps and the decadence of drug parties, 'and suddenly, at once, I saw myself in my full disgracefulness'."

Translations
The novel has been translated into Bulgarian, Danish, Dutch, Estonian, French, Hebrew, Italian, Latvian, Lithuanian, Romanian, Russian, Spanish and Swedish

Adaptation
Since 2004 a stage version of the novel, directed by Matthias Hartmann, has been performed in theatres in Zurich, Bochum, Hannover and Vienna.

References

External links
 1979 at the publisher's website 

2001 novels
German-language novels
Swiss novels adapted into plays
Novels by Christian Kracht
Novels set in the 1970s
Novels set in Iran
Novels set in Tibet
Postmodern novels
Swiss novels
Kiepenheuer & Witsch books